George Stringer VC (24 July 1889 – 22 November 1957) from Miles Platting, Manchester was an English recipient of the Victoria Cross, the highest and most prestigious award for gallantry in the face of the enemy that can be awarded to British and Commonwealth forces.

Early life
Upon leaving school, Stringer worked for a local cloth dyer and bleacher. In 1905, he joined the Lancashire Fusilier Volunteers, a militia unit, and just before the outbreak of World War I he joined a territorial unit of the Manchester Regiment, then went on active duty with the 1st Battalion.

Military career
His unit fought in France until December 1915, then was posted to Mesopotamia in January 1916. He was awarded the VC for heroic actions during the Battle of Es Sinn on 8 March 1916. During the effort to relieve the besieged garrison of British and Indian Army troops at Kut-el-Amara.

His citation in the London Gazette read:

Stringer was subsequently Mentioned in Despatches and also awarded the Gold Medal for Bravery by the Kingdom of Serbia. He was later wounded, developed enteric fever and jaundice, and was returned to the UK in June 1917.

As a result of his wounds, Stringer was given a disability pension and a job as a doorkeeper with the Manchester Assistance Board which he kept until he retired aged 62, with time out during World War II for a stint as a munitions worker. He died six years later in the town of Oldham and was buried in Philips Park Cemetery, close to William Jones VC.

Stringer's medals are in the collection of the Museum of The Manchester Regiment, Ashton-under-Lyne, Greater Manchester.

See also
 Mesopotamian campaign
 Battle of Ctesiphon

References

 Monuments to Courage (David Harvey, 1999)
 The Register of the Victoria Cross (This England, 1997)

External links
 Location of grave and VC medal
 Manchester Regiment Museum
  Jullundur Association

1889 births
1957 deaths
People from Newton Heath
British Army personnel of World War I
British World War I recipients of the Victoria Cross
Manchester Regiment soldiers
Recipients of the Medal for Bravery (Serbia)
British Army recipients of the Victoria Cross